Nicholas Young may refer to:

 Nicholas Young (executive) (1840–1916), baseball executive
 Nicholas Young (sailor) (1757–?), sailor on Captain James Cook's ship
 Nicholas Young (figure skater) (born 1982), Canadian figure skater
 Nicholas Young (actor) (born 1949), British actor
 Nicholas Young (mathematician), British mathematician
 Nicholas Yonge (c. 1560-1619), English composer

See also
 Nick Youngs (born 1959), English rugby union player
 Nick Young (disambiguation)